Gerdab-e Olya (also Romanized as Gerdāb-e ‘Olyā; also known as Gerdāb and Gerdāb Bālā) is a village in Vahdat Rural District, Mugarmun District, Landeh County, Kohgiluyeh and Boyer-Ahmad Province, Iran. At the 2006 census, its population was 68, in 14 families.

References 

Populated places in Landeh County